The Story of a Mother is a 1979 Danish drama film directed by Claus Weeke and starring Anna Karina. It is an adaptation of the Hans Christian Andersen short story of the same name.

Cast
 Anna Karina as Christine Olsen
 Gustaf Hagström as Barnet
 Daniel Duval as Døden
 Tove Maës as Lærerinden
 Bodil Udsen as Portnerkonen
 Finn Nielsen as Afdelingslederen
 Benny Hansen as Købmanden
 Judy Gringer as Christines kollega
 Sanne Salomonsen as Christines kollega
 Rita Angela as Christines kollega
 Jørn Faurschou as Agitator
 Gertie Jung as Kvinde, der kysser agitatoren

References

External links

1979 films
1979 drama films
Danish drama films
1970s Danish-language films
Films based on works by Hans Christian Andersen
Films with screenplays by Paul Gégauff
Films based on fairy tales